Mo Chit Station is a BTS Skytrain station, on the Sukhumvit Line in Chatuchak District, Bangkok, Thailand. The station is on the Phahon Yothin Highway between Soi Phahon Yothin 18 and Soi Phahon Yothin 20. The station is named after the former Mo Chit Bus Terminal, which previously occupied the area, and was the northern terminus of the Sukhumvit Line until 9 August 2019 when Ha Yaek Lat Phrao BTS Station opened.

Nearby landmarks
The station is connected to Chatuchak Park MRT Station which opened in 2004. Other nearby landmarks include BTS Depot, Chatuchak Park and Mo Chit Bus Station.

Gallery

See also
 BTS Skytrain

References

External links
 Mo chit store photos

BTS Skytrain stations